Karl Kangas (13 June 1886 – 8 February 1966) was a Finnish wrestler. He competed in the featherweight event at the 1912 Summer Olympics.

References

External links
 

1886 births
1966 deaths
People from Vihti
People from Uusimaa Province (Grand Duchy of Finland)
Finnish male sport wrestlers
Olympic wrestlers of Finland
Wrestlers at the 1912 Summer Olympics
Sportspeople from Uusimaa